Beech (Fagus) is a genus of deciduous trees in the family Fagaceae, native to temperate Europe, Asia, and North America. Recent classifications recognize 10 to 13 species in two distinct subgenera, Engleriana and Fagus. The Engleriana subgenus is found only in East Asia, distinctive for its low branches, often made up of several major trunks with yellowish bark. The better known Fagus subgenus beeches are high-branching with tall, stout trunks and smooth silver-grey bark. The European beech (Fagus sylvatica) is the most commonly cultivated.

Beeches are monoecious, bearing both male and female flowers on the same plant. The small flowers are unisexual, the female flowers borne in pairs, the male flowers wind-pollinating catkins. They are produced in spring shortly after the new leaves appear. The fruit of the beech tree, known as beechnuts or mast, is found in small burrs that drop from the tree in autumn. They are small, roughly triangular, and edible, with a bitter, astringent, or mild and nut-like taste.

The European species Fagus sylvatica yields a utility timber that is tough but dimensionally unstable. It is widely used for furniture framing and carcase construction, flooring and engineering purposes, in plywood, and household items like plates, but rarely as a decorative wood. The timber can be used to build chalets, houses, and log cabins.

Beechwood also makes excellent firewood, easily split and burning for many hours with bright but calm flames. Slats of washed beech wood are spread around the bottom of fermentation tanks for Budweiser beer. Beech logs are burned to dry the malt used in some German smoked beers. Beech is also used to smoke Westphalian ham, andouille sausage, and some cheeses.

Description 

The European beech (Fagus sylvatica) is the most commonly cultivated, although few important differences are seen between species aside from detail elements such as leaf shape. Beeches are monoecious, bearing both male and female flowers on the same plant. The small flowers are unisexual, the female flowers borne in pairs, the male flowers wind-pollinating catkins. They are produced in spring shortly after the new leaves appear.

The bark is smooth and light gray. The husk can have a variety of spine- to scale-like appendages, the character of which is, in addition to leaf shape, one of the primary ways beeches are differentiated. The nuts have a bitter taste (though not nearly as bitter as acorns) and a high tannin content; these are called beechnuts or beech mast.

Taxonomy 
Recent classification systems of the genus recognize 10 to 13 species in two distinct subgenera, Engleriana and Fagus. The Engleriana subgenus is found only in East Asia, and is notably distinct from the Fagus subgenus in that these beeches are low-branching trees, often made up of several major trunks with yellowish bark. Further differentiating characteristics include the whitish bloom on the underside of the leaves, the visible tertiary leaf veins, and a long, smooth cupule-peduncle. Proposed by botanist Chung-Fu Shen in 1992, F. japonica, F. engleriana, and F. okamotoi comprise this subgenus.

The better known Fagus subgenus beeches are high-branching with tall, stout trunks and smooth silver-gray bark. This group includes F. sylvatica, F. grandifolia, F. crenata, F. lucida, F. longipetiolata, and F. hayatae. The classification of the European beech, F. sylvatica, is complex, with a variety of different names proposed for different species and subspecies within this region (for example F. taurica, F. orientalis, and F. moesica). Research suggests that beeches in Eurasia differentiated fairly late in evolutionary history, during the Miocene. The populations in this area represent a range of often overlapping morphotypes, and genetic analysis does not clearly support separate species.

Fagus is the most basal group in the evolution of the Fagaceae family, which also includes oaks and chestnuts. The southern beeches (genus Nothofagus) previously thought closely related to beeches, are now treated as members of a separate family, the Nothofagaceae (which remains a member of the order Fagales). They are found in Australia, New Zealand, New Guinea, New Caledonia, and Argentina and Chile (principally Patagonia and Tierra del Fuego).

Species
The following is a partial list of taxa, which have been accepted as species at one point: 
Fagus chienii 
Fagus crenata  – Siebold's beech or Japanese beech
Fagus engleriana  – Chinese beech
Fagus grandifolia  – American beech
Fagus hayatae  
Fagus japonica  
Fagus longipetiolata  
Fagus lucida  
Fagus orientalis  – Oriental beech
Fagus sylvatica  – European beech
Fagus × taurica  – Crimean beech

Fossil species
Numerous species have been name globally from the fossil record spanning from the Cretaceous to the Pleistocene

†Fagus aburatoensis  
†Fagus alnitifolia 
†Fagus altaensis 
†Fagus ambigua 
†Fagus angusta 
†Fagus antipofii 
†Fagus aperta 
†Fagus arduinorum 
†Fagus aspera 
†Fagus aspera  (jr homonym)
†Fagus atlantica 
†Fagus attenuata 
†Fagus aurelianii 
†Fagus australis 
†Fagus betulifolia 
†Fagus bonnevillensis 
†Fagus castaneifolia 
†Fagus celastrifolia 
†Fagus ceretana 
†Fagus chamaephegos 
†Fagus chankaica 
†Fagus chiericii 
†Fagus chinensis 
†Fagus coalita 
†Fagus cordifolia 
†Fagus cretacea 
†Fagus decurrens 
†Fagus dentata 
†Fagus deucalionis 
†Fagus dubia 
†Fagus dubia  (jr homonym)
†Fagus echinata 
†Fagus eocenica 
†Fagus etheridgei 
†Fagus ettingshausenii 
†Fagus europaea 
†Fagus evenensis 
†Fagus faujasii 
†Fagus feroniae 
†Fagus florinii 
†Fagus forumlivii 
†Fagus friedrichii 
†Fagus gortanii 
†Fagus grandifoliiformis 
†Fagus gussonii 
†Fagus haidingeri 
†Fagus herthae 
†Fagus hitchcockii 
†Fagus hondoensis 
†Fagus hookeri 
†Fagus horrida 
†Fagus humata 
†Fagus idahoensis 
†Fagus inaequalis 
†Fagus incerta 
†Fagus integrifolia 
†Fagus intermedia 
†Fagus irvajamensis 
†Fagus japoniciformis 
†Fagus japonicoides 
†Fagus jobanensis 
†Fagus jonesii 
†Fagus juliae 
†Fagus kitamiensis 
†Fagus koraica 
†Fagus kraeuselii 
†Fagus kuprianoviae 
†Fagus lancifolia  (nomen nudum)
†Fagus langevinii 
†Fagus laptoneura 
†Fagus latissima 
†Fagus leptoneuron 
†Fagus macrophylla 
†Fagus maorica 
†Fagus marsillii 
†Fagus menzelii 
†Fagus microcarpa 
†Fagus miocenica 
†Fagus napanensis 
†Fagus nelsonica 
†Fagus oblonga 
†Fagus oblonga 
†Fagus obscura 
†Fagus olejnikovii 
†Fagus orbiculatum 
†Fagus orientaliformis 
†Fagus orientalis var fossilis 
†Fagus orientalis var palibinii 
†Fagus pacifica 
†Fagus palaeococcus 
†Fagus palaeocrenata 
†Fagus palaeograndifolia 
†Fagus palaeojaponica 
†Fagus pittmanii 
†Fagus pliocaenica  (jr homonym)
†Fagus pliocenica 
†Fagus polycladus 
†Fagus praelucida 
†Fagus praeninnisiana 
†Fagus praeulmifolia 
†Fagus prisca 
†Fagus pristina 
†Fagus producta 
†Fagus protojaponica 
†Fagus protolongipetiolata 
†Fagus protonucifera 
†Fagus pseudoferruginea 
†Fagus pygmaea 
†Fagus pyrrhae 
†Fagus salnikovii 
†Fagus sanctieugeniensis 
†Fagus saxonica 
†Fagus schofieldii 
†Fagus septembris 
†Fagus shagiana 
†Fagus stuxbergii 
†Fagus subferruginea 
†Fagus succinea 
†Fagus sylvatica var diluviana 
†Fagus sylvatica var pliocenica 
†Fagus tenella 
†Fagus uemurae 
†Fagus uotanii 
†Fagus vivianii 
†Fagus washoensis 

Fossil species formerly placed in Fagus include:

†Alnus paucinervis 
†Castanea abnormalis 
†Fagopsis longifolia 
†Fagopsis undulata 
†Fagoxylon grandiporosum 
†Fagus-pollenites parvifossilis 
†Juglans ginannii  (new name for F. ginannii)
†Nothofagaphyllites novae-zealandiae 
†Nothofagus benthamii 
†Nothofagus dicksonii 
†Nothofagus lendenfeldii 
†Nothofagus luehmannii 
†Nothofagus magelhaenica 
†Nothofagus maidenii 
†Nothofagus muelleri 
†Nothofagus ninnisiana 
†Nothofagus risdoniana 
†Nothofagus ulmifolia 
†Nothofagus wilkinsonii 
†Trigonobalanus minima

Etymology 
The name of the tree in Latin, fagus (from whence the generic epithet), is cognate with English "beech" and of Indo-European origin, and played an important role in early debates on the geographical origins of the Indo-European people, the beech argument. Greek φηγός (figós) is from the same root, but the word was transferred to the oak tree (e.g. Iliad 16.767) as a result of the absence of beech trees in southern Greece.

Distribution and habitat

Britain and Ireland 
Fagus sylvatica was a late entrant to Great Britain after the last glaciation, and may have been restricted to basic soils in the south of England. Some suggest that it was introduced by Neolithic tribes who planted the trees for their edible nuts. The beech is classified as a native in the south of England and as a non-native in the north where it is often removed from 'native' woods. Large areas of the Chilterns are covered with beech woods, which are habitat to the common bluebell and other flora. The Cwm Clydach National Nature Reserve in southeast Wales was designated for its beech woodlands, which are believed to be on the western edge of their natural range in this steep limestone gorge.

Beech is not native to Ireland; however, it was widely planted in the 18th century and can become a problem shading out the native woodland understory.

The tallest and longest hedge in the world (according to Guinness World Records) is the Meikleour Beech Hedge in Meikleour, Perth and Kinross, Scotland.

Continental Europe 
Fagus sylvatica is one of the most common hardwood trees in north-central Europe, in France constituting alone about 15% of all nonconifers. Eastern Europe is also home to the lesser-known oriental beech (F. orientalis) and Crimean beech (F. taurica).

As a naturally growing forest tree, beech marks the important border between the European deciduous forest zone and the northern pine forest zone. This border is important for wildlife and fauna.

In Denmark and Scania at the southernmost peak of the Scandinavian peninsula, southwest of the natural spruce boundary, it is the most common forest tree.  It grows naturally in Denmark and southern Norway and Sweden up to about 57–59°N. The most northern known naturally growing (not planted) beech trees are found in a small grove north of Bergen on the west coast of Norway. Near the city of Larvik is the largest naturally occurring beech forest in Norway, Bøkeskogen.

Some research suggests that early agriculture patterns supported the spread of beech in continental Europe. Research has linked the establishment of beech stands in Scandinavia and Germany with cultivation and fire disturbance, i.e. early agricultural practices. Other areas which have a long history of cultivation, Bulgaria for example, do not exhibit this pattern, so how much human activity has influenced the spread of beech trees is as yet unclear.

The primeval beech forests of the Carpathians are also an example of a singular, complete, and comprehensive forest dominated by a single tree species - the beech tree. Forest dynamics here were allowed to proceed without interruption or interference since the last ice age. Nowadays, they are amongst the last pure beech forests in Europe to document the undisturbed postglacial repopulation of the species, which also includes the unbroken existence of typical animals and plants. These virgin beech forests and similar forests across 12 countries in continental Europe were inscribed on the UNESCO World Heritage List in 2007.

North America 
The American beech (Fagus grandifolia) occurs across much of the eastern United States and southeastern Canada, with a disjunct population in Mexico. It is the only Fagus species in the Western Hemisphere. Before the Pleistocene Ice Age, it is believed to have spanned the entire width of the continent from the Atlantic Ocean to the Pacific but now is confined to the east of the Great Plains. F. grandifolia tolerates hotter climates than European species but is not planted much as an ornamental due to slower growth and less resistance to urban pollution. It most commonly occurs as an overstory component in the northern part of its range with sugar maple, transitioning to other forest types further south such as beech-magnolia. American beech is rarely encountered in developed areas except as a remnant of a forest that was cut down for land development.

The dead brown leaves of the American beech remain on the branches until well into the following spring, when the new buds finally push them off.

Asia 
East Asia is home to five species of Fagus, only one of which (F. crenata) is occasionally planted in Western countries. Smaller than F. sylvatica and F. grandifolia, this beech is one of the most common hardwoods in its native range.

Ecology 
Beech grows on a wide range of soil types, acidic or basic, provided they are not waterlogged. The tree canopy casts dense shade and thickens the ground with leaf litter.

In North America, they can form beech-maple climax forests by partnering with the sugar maple.

The beech blight aphid (Grylloprociphilus imbricator) is a common pest of American beech trees. Beeches are also used as food plants by some species of Lepidoptera.

Beech bark is extremely thin and scars easily. Since the beech tree has such delicate bark, carvings, such as lovers' initials and other forms of graffiti, remain because the tree is unable to heal itself.

Diseases 

Beech bark disease is a fungal infection that attacks the American beech through damage caused by scale insects. Infection can lead to the death of the tree.

Beech leaf disease is a disease spread by the newly discovered nematode, Litylenchus crenatae mccannii. This disease was first discovered in Lake County, Ohio, in 2012 and has now spread to over 41 counties in Ohio, Pennsylvania, New York, and Ontario, Canada.

Cultivation 
The beech most commonly grown as an ornamental tree is the European beech (Fagus sylvatica), widely cultivated in North America and its native Europe. Many varieties are in cultivation, notably the weeping beech F. sylvatica 'Pendula', several varieties of copper or purple beech, the fern-leaved beech F. sylvatica 'Asplenifolia', and the tricolour beech F. sylvatica 'Roseomarginata'. The columnar Dawyck beech (F. sylvatica 'Dawyck') occurs in green, gold, and purple forms, named after Dawyck Botanic Garden in the Scottish Borders, one of the four garden sites of the Royal Botanic Garden Edinburgh.

Uses 

Beech wood is an excellent firewood, easily split and burning for many hours with bright but calm flames. Slats of beech wood are washed in caustic soda to leach out any flavour or aroma characteristics and are spread around the bottom of fermentation tanks for Budweiser beer. This provides a complex surface on which the yeast can settle, so that it does not pile up, preventing yeast autolysis which would contribute off-flavours to the beer. Beech logs are burned to dry the malt used in German smoked beers. Beech is also used to smoke Westphalian ham, traditional andouille (an offal sausage) from Normandy, and some cheeses.

Some drums are made from beech, which has a tone between those of maple and birch, the two most popular drum woods.

The textile modal is a kind of rayon often made wholly from reconstituted cellulose of pulped beech wood.

The European species Fagus sylvatica yields a utility timber that is tough but dimensionally unstable. It weighs about 720 kg per cubic metre and is widely used for furniture framing and carcase construction, flooring, and engineering purposes, in plywood and household items like plates, but rarely as a decorative wood. The timber can be used to build chalets, houses, and log cabins.

Beech wood is used for the stocks of military rifles when traditionally preferred woods such as walnut are scarce or unavailable or as a lower-cost alternative.

The edible fruit of the beech tree, known as beechnuts or mast, is found in small burrs that drop from the tree in autumn. They are small, roughly triangular, and edible, with a bitter, astringent, or in some cases, mild and nut-like taste. According to the Roman statesman Pliny the Elder in his work Natural History, beechnut was eaten by the people of Chios when the town was besieged, writing of the fruit: "that of the beech is the sweetest of all; so much so, that, according to Cornelius Alexander, the people of the city of Chios, when besieged, supported themselves wholly on mast". The leaves can be steeped in liquor to give a light green/yellow liqueur. They can also be roasted and pulverized into an adequate coffee substitute.

In antiquity, the bark of the beech tree was used by Indo-European people for writing-related purposes, especially in a religious context. Beech wood tablets were a common writing material in Germanic societies before the development of paper. The Old English bōc has the primary sense of "beech" but also a secondary sense of "book", and it is from bōc that the modern word derives. In modern German, the word for "book" is Buch, with Buche meaning "beech tree". In modern Dutch, the word for "book" is boek, with beuk meaning "beech tree". In Swedish, these words are the same, bok meaning both "beech tree" and "book". There is a similar relationship in some Slavic languages. In Russian and Bulgarian, the word for beech is бук (buk), while that for "letter" (as in a letter of the alphabet) is буква (bukva), while Serbo-Croatian and Slovene use "bukva" to refer to the tree.

The pigment bistre was made from beech wood soot.

Beech litter raking as a replacement for straw in animal husbandry was an old non-timber practice in forest management that once occurred in parts of Switzerland in the 17th century. Beech has been listed as one of the 38 plants whose flowers are used to prepare Bach flower remedies.

See also 
 Ancient and Primeval Beech Forests of the Carpathians and Other Regions of Europe
 English Lowlands beech forests
 The Weeping Beech

References

External links 

 
 
 Traditional and Modern Use of Beech

 
Edible nuts and seeds
Ornamental trees